Within software engineering, the mining software repositories (MSR) field  analyzes the rich data available in software repositories, such as version control repositories, mailing list archives, bug tracking systems, issue tracking systems, etc.  to uncover interesting and actionable information about software systems, projects and software engineering.

Definition
Herzig and Zeller define ”mining software archives” as a process to ”obtain lots of initial evidence” by extracting data from software repositories. Further they define ”data sources” as product-based artifacts like source code, requirement artefacts or version archives and claim that these sources are unbiased, but noisy and incomplete.

Techniques

Coupled Change Analysis 
The idea in coupled change analysis is that developers change code entities (e.g. files) together frequently for fixing defects or introducing new features. These couplings between the entities are often not made explicit in the code or other documents. Especially developers new on the project do not know which entities need to be changed together. Coupled change analysis aims to extract the coupling out of the version control system for a project. By the commits and the timing of changes, we might be able to identify which entities frequently change together. This information could then be presented to developers about to change one of the entities to support them in their further changes.

Commit Analysis 

There are many different kinds of commits in version control systems, e.g. bug fix commits, new feature commits, documentation commits, etc. To take data-driven decisions based on past commits, one needs to select subsets of commits that meet a given criterion. That can be done based on the commit message.

Documentation generation 

It is possible to generate useful documentation from mining software repositories. For instance, Jadeite computes usage statistics and helps newcomers to quickly identify commonly used classes.

Data & Tools  

The primary mining data comes from version control systems. Early mining experiments were done on CVS repositories. Then, researchers have extensively analyzed SVN repositories. Now, Git repositories are dominant.

See also
 Software evolution
 Software analytics
 Software maintenance
 Software archaeology

References

Software engineering